Club Deportivo Jaguares de Jalisco is a Mexican professional football team based in Tala, Jalisco, Mexico currently playing in Liga de Balompié Mexicano.

History 
In February of 2020, the first assembly of teams interested in forming a new professional football competition in Mexico, called Liga de Balompié Mexicano, was held. In this event, the interest of a team called Jaguares de Jalisco was made known. On March 27, the club's participation was confirmed, being the third franchise to be registered in the new league. On April 30, the team appointed Juan Pablo García as manager.

On June 13, 2020, the Tres de Marzo stadium was announced as the venue for the team's matches, which will be shared with Tecos F.C. and Halcones de Zapopan.

On July 4, 2020 the team played its first game against Ameca FC. The game ended with a 3-1 victory in favor of Jaguares.

Stadium 
The first stadium was the Estadio 3 de Marzo, situated in Zapopan district that forms part of the Guadalajara Metropolitan Area, and is the ground of Tecos, which plays in the Liga Premier de México. The stadium has a capacity of 18,779 and was constructed on the campus of the Universidad Autónoma de Guadalajara.

In November 2020 the team moved to Centro Deportivo y Cultural 24 de Marzo located in Tala, Jalisco, this with the aim of demonstrating its interest in representing the entire State of Jalisco and not only the Guadalajara Metropolitan Area. This venue has a capacity to host 2,000 spectators and was opened in 2015.

Players

First-team squad

References 

Association football clubs established in 2020
2020 establishments in Mexico
Football clubs in Jalisco
Football clubs in Guadalajara, Jalisco
Liga de Balompié Mexicano Teams